Sim Chi Yin is an artist from Singapore whose research-based practice includes photography, moving image, archival interventions, book-making and text-based performance, and focuses on history, conflict, memory and extraction. She has exhibited in solo shows in Europe and Asia, and her work has been shown in biennales and triennials. 

Sim did her first two degrees in Cold War history and was active in the migrant worker rights movement in Singapore — using photography and media for advocacy — before becoming an award-winning journalist and foreign correspondent based in China for over a decade. Currently, she is in New York as a fellow in the Whitney Museum's Independent Study Program and is completing a PhD at King’s College London. 

She is working on a multi-chapter project around her family history and the decolonization war in Malaya, “One Day We’ll Understand” — most recently shown at the Istanbul Biennale 2022. Sim was commissioned as the Nobel Peace Prize photographer in 2017. Her work is in the collections of Harvard Art Museums, The J. Paul Getty Museum, M+ Hong Kong, Singapore Art Museum, and the National Museum Singapore. Sim is represented by Zilberman Gallery in Berlin and Hanart TZ Gallery in Hong Kong.

Life and work
Sim was born in Singapore. She read history and international relations at the London School of Economics on a scholarship.

She worked as a print journalist and foreign correspondent at The Straits Times for nine years. In 2010 she quit to work full time as a photographer. Within four years she was working as a photojournalist, getting regular assignments from The New York Times.

Her first major work was "The Rat Tribe", about blue-collar workers in Beijing. It has been published widely and was shown at Rencontres d'Arles in 2012.

Sim spent four years photographing Chinese gold miners living with the occupational lung disease silicosis, published in the photo essay "Dying To Breathe", much of it about He Quangui, also the subject of a short film.

She was commissioned as the Nobel Peace Prize photographer in 2017 to make work about its winner, the International Campaign to Abolish Nuclear Weapons. Her photographs of similarities in landscapes related to nuclear weapons, both in the USA and along the China-North Korea border, were exhibited at the Nobel Peace Center museum in Oslo, Norway.

In 2014 she became an interim member of VII Photo Agency, a full member in 2016 then left in 2017. In 2018 she became a nominee member of Magnum Photos.

 Sim was a PhD candidate on scholarship at King's College London, researching British Malaya.

Publications by Sim
The Long Road Home: Journeys Of Indonesian Migrant Workers. Jakarta: International Labour Organization, 2011. .
She Never Rode That Trishaw Again. Sim Chi Yin Studio, 2021. .

Short films
Dying To Breathe (2015) – 10 minute film, directed and filmed by Sim
Most People Were Silent (2017) – 3:40 minute film with audio soundscape, directed and filmed by Sim

Awards
2010: Magnum Foundation Social Justice and Photography fellowship at New York University
2013: Finalist, W. Eugene Smith Grant in Humanistic Photography from the W. Eugene Smith Memorial Fund
2014: Her World Young Woman Achiever
2018: Chris Hondros Award from Getty Images and the Chris Hondros Fund

References

External links

"Singapore life through the lens of a photojournalist – video"
Dying To Breathe – 10 minute film on Vimeo

1978 births
Living people
Singaporean artists
Singaporean photojournalists
Magnum photographers
VII Photo Agency photographers
Women photojournalists
Singaporean women artists